Indrek Siska (born 14 May 1984) is a retired Estonian professional beach soccer midfielder and striker, who played in Swiss club BSC Solothurn.

His previous club were Estonian Augur and Israeli Kfar Qasem BSC.

He was also the member of Estonia national beach soccer team. He is the team's top scorer with 28 goals in 16 games.

He was given a life-long ban in 2014 for match-fixing.

Achievements

Beach soccer

Club
Estonian Cup
Winner 2010 

Rannajalgpalli Meistriliiga 
Champion 2007, 2012 
Runner-up 2008, 2009

National team
All-time top scorer (28 goals)

Individual
Champions league top goal scorer 2008 
Rannajalgpalli Meistriliiga top goalscorer 2008 
Estonian best beach soccer player 2008 
Rannajalgpalli Meistriliiga top goalscorer 2009 
Rannajalgpalli Meistriliiga top goalscorer 2010 
Rannajalgpalli Meistriliiga top goalscorer 2012 
Estonian best beach soccer player 2012

Futsal

Club
Saalijalgpalli Meistriliiga
Champion 2008 
Runner-up 2010

National team
Top goal scorer 2008

References

External links
Profile (beach soccer) on Estonian Football Association homepage

Living people
1984 births
Estonian footballers
JK Tallinna Kalev players
Estonian beach soccer players
Association football midfielders